Dark Tower is a 1981 electronic board game, by Milton Bradley Company, for one to four players. The object of the game is to amass an army, collect the three keys to the Tower, and defeat the evil within.  The game came out during the height of the role-playing game craze in the early 1980s. Advertising for the game included a television commercial featuring Orson Welles.  

A sequel, Return to Dark Tower, was developed by Restoration Games and released in 2022.

Components
The game consists of a battery-powered center unit (the Dark Tower), a circular cardboard game board divided into four interlocking quarters (with a hole in the middle for the Tower), four cardboard tokens, several plastic flags, playing pieces, and locations which are placed in holes in the board.  In addition, there are several peg boards (with red Battleship-type pegs) used to keep track of a player's number of troops, gold and food.

The Tower itself consists of a small membrane keyboard beneath a "display" (a piece of tinted plastic).  Behind the display cover is a carousel containing a number of film cels, which, when backlit by one of three lights mounted underneath, display the appropriate picture on the display cover.  The display cover also conceals a digital LED display for representing numbers up to 99.  As the Tower rotates and illuminates the appropriate cells during gameplay, it also emits sounds for the events represented by each cell.

The artwork was by Bob Pepper.

Gameplay
To play, each player takes turns rotating the Tower to face them and then moving their chosen hero about the board either clockwise or anticlockwise. The quarter of the board in front of a particular player is their territory.  Gameplay proceeds by moving a player's token one space and then pressing a button on the Tower that corresponds to the type of space (e.g., Sanctuary, Tomb, Bazaar, Frontier, free/unoccupied space and ultimately onto the Dark Tower space). The Tower then resolves what happens to the player by showing the player the appropriate cel and reporting whatever occurs. For instance, if the Tower decides that the player has encountered Brigands, it will turn to the Brigands cel, simultaneously displaying the number of brigands encountered. If the player chooses to fight, the Tower resolves the battle by alternately counting off the remaining numbers of friendly troops and Brigands down to a win or loss(unless the hero runs from the battle..).  Once all events have resolved, the Tower is rotated to the next player and their turn begins.

Each territory besides a player's own contains one of three keys—bronze, silver and gold, in that order—needed to unlock the Tower.  The location of the key is randomly determined by the Tower.  Each player will therefore need to travel around the board, through each of the other three players' territories, until the player has all three keys.  At this point, the player returns to their territory, buys reinforcements for a maximum complement of warriors, and then attempts to unlock the tower with a key code which once cracked brings them to the final battle to defeat the Tower, which contains a predetermined number of defenders inside. The first player to beat the Tower wins the game; losing requires building up another army.

Rarity
Working copies of Dark Tower are increasingly difficult to find and thus highly sought after by collectors.  This is primarily due to two things: (1) wear and tear on the tower unit, which tended to experience technical faults with the light bulbs and carousel after prolonged use, and (2) the fact that the game went out of print shortly after release due to a lawsuit brought against Milton Bradley for intellectual property theft.

Litigation
Dark Tower was the subject of trade secret litigation in 1985.  Two independent game developers named Robert Burton and Allen Coleman submitted a game to Milton Bradley titled "Triumph" that involved an electronic tower as the centerpiece.  Milton Bradley rejected the game, but proceeded to release Dark Tower some time later.  The inventors sued for misappropriation of trade secrets and won a jury verdict for over $700,000.  The trial judge, however, vacated the jury's judgement.  Despite finding that Milton Bradley had likely "plagiarized the plaintiffs' idea without so much as a by-your-leave" the judge proceeded to issue a directed verdict for the defendant because Burton and Coleman had signed a contract waiving any contractual relationship (which arguably included any duty of confidentiality).  The First Circuit Court of Appeals reversed, finding evidence that Milton Bradley entered an implied agreement to keep the game confidential and reinstated the damage award.

Reception
Games magazine included Dark Tower in their "Top 100 Games of 1981", noting especially how the "tower itself swivels so that each player alone views what happens to his own band of warriors".

In a retrospective review of Dark Tower in Black Gate, Scott Taylor said "as I remembered Dark Tower, and its card game predecessor Dragonmaster, I couldn't help but get incredibly nostalgic. There was something truly unique about those games, something almost spiritual, and I can credit this most certainly with the artist who brought them to us, Bob Pepper."

Legacy
Several web-based versions of the game have been developed over the years; an app called Droid Tower developed by Muse of Water was available for Android; and a similar app by MacCrafters is available for iOS.

Sequel

Return to Dark Tower was launched on Kickstarter on January 14, 2020, by Restoration Games as a cooperative game for 1-4 players. Designed by Isaac Childres and Rob Daviau, the creators of Gloomhaven and Pandemic Legacy respectively, the game features a motorized rotating tower guided by an app. The game is tentatively set to have fulfillment commence before end of July 2021.

See also
Enchanted Palace (1994-1995)

References

External links
 
 Original TV commercial with Orson Welles on YouTube
 Dark Tower review with photos, at gamepile.com
 Dark Tower for Android
 Dark Tower for iOS
 Multi player Dark Tower for PC
 Single Player Dark Tower for PC

Board games introduced in 1981
Fantasy board games
Milton Bradley Company games
Electronic board games